Corrado Giaquinto (8 February 1703 – 18 April 1766) was an Italian Rococo painter.

Early training and move to Rome
He was born in Molfetta. As a boy he apprenticed with a modest local painter Saverio Porta, (c1667–1725), escaping the religious career his parents had intended for him. By October 1724, he left Molfetta, and along with his contemporaries Francesco de Mura (1696–1784) and Giuseppe Bonito (1707–1789), he trained from 1719 to 1723 in the prolific Neapolitan studio of Francesco Solimena, either with Solimena or his pupil, Nicola Maria Rossi. 

Giaquinto followed a peripatetic career, with long sojourns in Naples, Rome (between 1723 and 1753), Turin (1733 and 1735–39), and Madrid (1753–1761).

In 1723, he moved to Rome to work in the studio of Sebastiano Conca. He painted in San Lorenzo in Damaso, San Giovanni Calibita, and the ceiling at Santa Croce in Gerusalemme. In March 1727, with Giuseppe Rossi as an assistant, Giaquinto opened an independent studio near the Ponte Sisto, in the parish of Saint Giovanni of the Malva in Rome. In 1734, he married Caterina Silvestri Agate.

The first documented work by his hand is Christ crucified with the Madonna, Saint John Evangelist, and Magdalene commissioned in 1730 by king John V of Portugal for the cathedral of the Mafra.

In 1731, he received a prestigious commission, to execute frescoes in the church of San Nicola dei Lorenesi: Saint Nicholas water gush from cliff, three theologic and cardinal Virtues, and in the cupola Paradise. The latest restoration confirms Giaquinto's stylistic independence from Solimena, and reveals his stylistic dependence on Luca Giordano.

Mature work 

In 1733, the architect and artistic director for the House of Savoy, Filippo Juvarra, invited Giaquinto to come to Turin, where he painted an altarpiece of Saint John Nepomuk. He then decorated the ceiling of a Villa della Regina with a Triumph of the House of Savoy, Death of Adonis and Apollo & Daphne, and Story of Aenid. Giaquinto returned briefly to Rome in 1735, where his wife died soon after childbirth. He then returned for the next three years, to complete frescoes for the chapel of St Joseph in the church of Santa Teresa in Turin; they depict events in the life and death of Saint Joseph, including his Assumption and Rest in Egypt.
 
In 1738 Giaquinto returned to Rome, and during the next year he executed in fresco an Assumption of the Virgin for the church of Rocca di Papa, a commission for a relative of Pope Alexander VIII Ottoboni. 

In 1740, Giaquinto became a member of the Academy of Saint Luke and donated his sketch of  Immaculate Conception with Elias the prophet for the Turinese church of the Carmine, a canvas commissioned by marquis Giuseppe Turinetti di Priero, which finally reached Turin in 1741. A report of 1742 states that Pope Benedict XIV "was taken to the church of San Giovanni Calabita ... where he observed with much pleasure the restoration of that Church embellished with altarpieces from the Painter Signor Corrado Napolitano".

In Madrid, he was patronized by Ferdinand VI, and was ultimately appointed director of the Academy of San Fernando. His influence there was felt by painters such as Antonio González Velázquez, José del Castillo, Mariano Salvador Maella, and Francisco Goya.

His paintings include A Kneeling Male Nude. He returned to Naples in 1762 to decorate the sacristy in San Luigi di Palazzo, the royal monastery. He died in Naples in 1766.

Among his pupils in Molfetta was Niccoló Porta.

Gallery

References

Sources

Italian Wikipedia entry

External links

Works of Corrado Giaquinto at www.Corrado-Giaquinto.org
Works of Corrado Giaquinto at http://www.the-athenaeum.org

1703 births
1765 deaths
People from Molfetta
18th-century Italian painters
Italian male painters
Painters from Naples
Italian Baroque painters
Rococo painters
18th-century Italian male artists